The Bold and the Beautiful is a long-running American soap opera which has aired on CBS Daytime since March 23, 1987, and is the most-watched soap opera worldwide.

The following section comprises past and current characters that have appeared on the show that debuted between 1987 and 2012.

Bill Spencer 

William "Bill" Spencer is a fictional character from the CBS Daytime soap opera, The Bold and the Beautiful. The character appeared regularly from 1987 through 1994, with several brief appearances afterwards, and was portrayed by Jim Storm.

Storylines

Bill is overprotective of Caroline and strongly objects when she falls in love with Ridge Forrester, the playboy son of the famous fashion designer, Eric Forrester, and his wife, Stephanie. He forbids Ridge from continuing to date his daughter. The headstrong Ridge responds by proposing to her. Just before the wedding ceremony, Bill tells Caroline that he had Ridge followed and knows for a fact that he slept with another woman just a week before. She is furious with her father and goes on with the wedding, walking down the aisle alone. But before she gets to Ridge, she faints.

Bill's efforts are successful, Caroline doesn't marry Ridge. Later, tragedy strikes. Caroline is raped by a man named Ron Deacon. Bill notices how Ridge's younger brother, Thorne, supports her through her recovery. Bill wants Caroline to marry him, and she does. But she's still in love with Ridge, and despite all Bill's efforts to prevent it, she divorces Thorne to reunite with Ridge.

Caroline eventually marries Ridge, but afterwards becomes ill with leukemia. Bill is devastated when she dies. Bill tells his lover Margo Lynley about his other daughter Karen. Margo enlists the help of Blake Hayes, who eventually tracks Karen down in Texas, where she goes by the name of Faith Roberts. Bill and Karen are soon reunited. Despite Margo being pregnant by scheming fashion designer, Clarke Garrison. Bill and Margo marry, and Bill adopts the baby. But their marriage does not last, and Margo leaves town with the child.

Bill moves to New York City where he builds Spencer Publications into an international media conglomerate and gains a reputation for being enormously wealthy and extremely ruthless in business. In 2009, Bill is diagnosed with a terminal illness. It's revealed that Bill fathered a previously unknown illegitimate son Bill Spencer Jr. In his will, Bill gives Donna Logan a small jeweled container that was empty inside, a symbol of his opinion of Donna. Clarke received a gold medal made of chocolate with a note that read "as fake as your designs". He wills Spencer Publications to his two living children, Karen and Bill Jr., who each receive 50 percent and are named co-CEO. Karen gave Stephanie a final letter from Bill that he wanted Karen to deliver personally. Bill offered his respect for Stephanie over the years, congratulated her on her new partnership at Jackie M Designs and asked her to mentor Karen in business and personally just as she did with Caroline.

Bill also makes a DVD for his son in which he gives him half of Spencer Publications on the condition that Bill Jr. use the company to avenge Stephanie, whom Bill reveals to be his true love, by taking over Forrester Creations and crushing Eric. Bill reveals Stephanie refused to leave her husband thus nothing happened between them but that he was heartbroken when Eric humiliated Stephanie with his public affairs with Brooke Logan and Donna Logan then fired her from the company she co-founded.

In May 2012, Karen reveals to Bill Jr. she has been in a long-term relationship with Danielle after years of being forced by their father to hide her orientation. Karen also reveals Bill threatened to disown and disinherit her, refused to meet Danielle or acknowledge that Karen had a partner, and attempted to marry her to a junior executive at Spencer Publications for show. Bill and Karen agreed to keep her secret from everyone, including his son Bill Jr. Bill's granddaughter Caroline Spencer reveals to her boyfriend Thomas Forrester that Bill had only met her twice, once on New Year's and once on the Fourth of July. Thomas tells Caroline that he always heard that Bill was a "powerhouse".

Rocco Garner
Rocco Garner was played by Bryan Genesse from 1987 to 1989. Prior to his exit, Rocco was involved in a love triangle with sisters Katie and Donna Logan, and bought a ring to propose to Donna. In 2009, Genesse returned to the series. Upon his return on March 12, 2009, it was revealed that Rocco stayed in contact with the Forresters.

Kristen Forrester Dominguez

Kristen Forrester Dominguez is the older daughter of Eric Forrester and Stephanie Forrester. At the show's beginning, she was portrayed by Teri Ann Linn. People magazine reported the character to be a "rich bitch". Of her casting, Linn said, "This is an opportunity I had to take". Meridith Brown, an editor of Soap Opera Digest, predicted that Linn would be a "breakaway star" and nasty characters like Kristen "are ones that become very popular in daytime." Linn departed in 1990, with additional appearances in 1992 and 1994. Tracy Melchior has played Kristen on and off since 2001. The character resides in Florida, and only comes to Los Angeles for significant events. She most recently appeared at a Christmas party with the other Forresters in December 2013 and then in February 2017 for Zende's wedding.

Beth Logan

Beth Logan is the matriarch of the Logan family, and was a series regular when the series began. She was originally portrayed by Judith Baldwin in 1987. After Baldwin left the role, Nancy Burnett began playing Beth from June 2, 1987, to 1989. Marla Adams briefly played Beth in 1991. Adams was known for her role as Dina Mergeron on The Young and the Restless; her casting for the part of Beth was announced on November 24, 1990. In 1994 Burnett returned, and had various guest appearances until 2001. Upon the character's 2008 return, Robin Riker played Beth, who arrived with a "new personality". Riker's portrayal was met with acclaim; Tommy Garrett Canyon News named her "Leading Lady" of the week ending August 29, 2009, along with Susan Flannery (Stephanie Forrester), for their "Epic Battle". Garret said Riker "showed viewers that she is capable of high drama".

As a teenager, Beth fell in love with Eric Forrester (John McCook).  However, another woman, Stephanie Douglas, manipulated Eric into marrying her instead. Beth then married Stephen Logan and they had four children together, including Brooke Logan (Katherine Kelly Lang). Briefly, it was speculated that Brooke was the product of Eric and Beth's love affair decades earlier, however, it was confirmed that she wasn't. During her marriage to Stephen, he abandoned her and his children, leaving Beth as the Logan's sole provider. In 1991, Brooke married Eric, which upset Beth, who had remained in love with Eric throughout her marriage and break-up from Stephen.

Beth returns to Los Angeles in 2008 at the request of Nick Marone (Jack Wagner), because he thinks her youngest daughter, Katie, who recently had a heart transplant, needs her. Her family becomes worried about Beth's strange behavior. Beth eventually reveals to Katie that she has had several mini-strokes and is also in the early stages of dementia. It takes some convincing from her family, but Beth finally agrees to stay in Los Angeles and receive treatment from her granddaughter Dr. Bridget Forrester (Ashley Jones) and Dr. Taylor Hayes (Hunter Tylo). The treatment appears to be working. Stephen and Beth have also hinted at a possible reconciliation. After a long absence Stephen and Beth reappeared for Nick and Bridget's wedding and it was mentioned that they had been in Paris. Beth dies in the Forrester pool after a fight between her and Stephanie in 2010, devastating the Logans.

Helen Logan

Helen Logan was the matriarch of the Logan family, affectionately known as "Grandma Logan." She was portrayed by Lesley Woods from 1987 to 1989, with an appearance in 2001.

Helen Logan was the matriarch of the Logan family, affectionately known as "Grandma Logan." Helen constantly reminded her daughter-in-law, Beth Henderson, that her son, Stephen, had run off because Beth had never fallen out of love with Stephen's rival, Eric Forrester. Living alone, Helen one day opened her door to two men who robbed her and even took her most recent pension check. Afterwards, Helen was invited to move in with Beth and her children, Storm, Brooke, Donna, and Katie. Surprised when Stephen returned to reclaim his family – and unaware that Eric's jealous wife, Stephanie Forrester, had engineered it to keep Beth away from Eric – Helen joined Stephen and Beth when they moved away to Paris.

Helen was in attendance when Brooke married Eric's son, Thorne Forrester, in 2001. By 2003, Beth told Brooke that Grandma Logan had passed away.

Margo Maclaine Lynley
Margo Maclaine Lynley was portrayed by Lauren Koslow from 1987 to 1992, with a reappearance from the character in 2002.

Margo Lynley is a divorcée from Wisconsin who worked as personal assistant to Eric Forrester, head of design house Forrester Creations. Margo had a short-lived fling with Eric's son, Ridge Forrester, who wouldn't commit, which prompted her to confess to Eric she'd been in love with Eric for years. Knowing Eric was married to Stephanie Forrester, Margo offered to resign but was allowed to keep her job at Forrester, eventually being invited to join its design team.

Margo accepted the attentions of publishing magnate Bill Spencer Sr., keeping their involvement quiet since the Forresters hated Bill for trying to steal Thorne Forrester for his company and working to keep Ridge away from his daughter, Caroline Spencer. But Margo also began seeing designer Clarke Garrison, who was married to Kristen Forrester, and became pregnant. Margo hired attorney Storm Logan and threatened to sue the deadbeat Clarke if he didn't pay her $100,000 in child support. Margo delivered a boy, Mark; Margo asked Storm to be Mark's godfather and fumed when Clarke showed little interest in his son.

Hoping to sway Kristen away from Clarke, Margo tracked down Kristen's ex-boyfriend Mick Savage and brought him to Los Angeles, but the ploy didn't work. Though Margo was happy that Clarke finally acknowledged Mark when the infant was hospitalized with a fever, Margo finally gave up on Clarke and accepted a proposal from Bill. Margo designed the showstopper for a joint fashion show with competitor Spectra Fashions on the Queen Mary and was shocked to discover Spectra had the same showstopper, as Clarke had inadvertently copied Margo's sketch.

Margo intervened when young Felicia Forrester began dating tennis instructor Jake Maclaine, initially keeping it secret that Jake was Margo's brother. Margo felt Jake was bad news since he had run away from home as a teen and cut off their parents. After Jake refused her offer of $5,000 to leave town, Margo flew home to Wisconsin to question her parents, who assumed Jake was dead. Margo was stunned when Jake confessed that their father, Ben Maclaine, had molested him. Home to visit a gravely ill Ben, Margo saved Jake from being asphyxiated in the garage by their uncle, Charlie Maclaine, who had actually been guilty of molesting Jake.

Wanting a father for Mark but miserable in her marriage to Bill, who was angry she had kept her family problems a secret, Margo got to know Blake Hayes and freely talked to him about Forrester Creations, not knowing Blake was searching for information about Ridge because Ridge was married to Blake's ex-wife, Taylor Hayes. Margo and Blake embarked on an affair which Margo flaunted to Bill, especially after learning Bill was fooling around with Julie Delorean. Margo thought better of her involvement with Blake when he attacked Bill for catching them together, but by then there was no hope for Margo and Bill's marriage.

Margo was shocked when Jake confessed to stealing Forrester Creations' innovative wrinkle-free formula, BeLieF. Margo knew that Jake was trying to cover for his ex-girlfriend, Macy Alexander, who stood accused of the theft, so Margo asked Eric not to prosecute Jake, then returned to Wisconsin with her brother.

In 2002, Margo appeared via a flashback experienced by her grown-up son, now known as Mark Maclaine, who came to Los Angeles to confront Clarke; the recollection featured Margo advising Mark not to meet with his father. Margo has not been seen nor mentioned since.

Dave Reed

Dave Reed was a plainclothes Los Angeles police sergeant who was dating Brooke Logan, a college chemistry student. Dave encouraged Brooke to press charges when she was nearly raped by two thugs, then suggested, against the wishes of Brooke's brother, Storm Logan, that Brooke use herself as bait to put her would-be rapists behind bars. Dave was also on the case when Brooke's friend, Caroline Spencer, was raped by a different assailant, Ron Deacon.

Dave felt lucky to be accepted by Brooke's family, which included Storm, her sisters Donna and Katie Logan, and their mother, Beth Henderson. Dave proposed to Brooke and agreed to wait on a wedding until she had graduated and found a job. Dave was more amused than anything else when Brooke joined her mother, Beth Henderson, on a catering job and became fascinated with the rich Forrester family, who ran fashion design house Forrester Creations. Ultimately Dave received a shock when Brooke broke off their engagement and became involved with Forrester's heir apparent, Ridge Forrester. Dave then disappeared from the canvas and his whereabouts are unknown, though he was mentioned as recently as 2016 when Brooke and Ridge reminisced about their 30-year on-again-off-again relationship.

He was portrayed by Stephen Shortridge in 1987.

Deveney Dixon
Deveney Dixon was portrayed by Judith Borne from 1988 to 1989. She was an imposter who claimed to be the deceased Angela Forrester, daughter of Eric Forrester and Stephanie Forrester.

Saul Feinberg
Saul Feinberg was the long-time assistant to Sally Spectra at Spectra Creations. He was portrayed by Michael Fox from 1989 to 1996.

Julie Delorean
Julie Delorea was portrayed by Jane A. Rogers from 1990 to 1992.

Ben Maclaine
Ben Maclaine was portrayed by John Brandon from 1990 to 1991.

Helen Maclaine
Helen Maclaine was portrayed by actress Tippi Hedren from 1990 to 1991.

Jake Maclaine
Jake Maclaine was portrayed by Todd McKee from 1990 to 1992. The character returned to the show from 2007 to 2013, and again from 2015 to 2016, and 2018.

Pierre Jourdan
Pierre Jourdan was portrayed by Robert Clary from 1990 to 1992.

Blake Hayes
Blake Hayes was portrayed by Peter Brown from 1991 to 1992.

C. J. Garrison

C. J. Garrison is a fictional character in the American soap opera The Bold and the Beautiful, portrayed by Mick Cain from December 1997 to January 2001, July 2002 to August 2003, returning briefly in 2004, 2007, 2010 and 2017.

Storylines
Clarke Jr. was born to Sally Spectra (played by Darlene Conley) and Clarke Garrison (Daniel McVicar). Not long after C.J.'s birth, Clarke left town. C.J. grew into a disobedient child in his early teens, having a cynical view on the world and starting a food fight with Brooke Logan Forrester (Katherine Kelly Lang) and Eric Forrester's (John McCook) son, Rick, who was close to C.J.'s age. His father returned in 1996 and C.J. was initially resentful of Clarke until Clarke rescued him from kidnappers.
 
A few years later in December 1997, C.J. and Rick (then played by Jacob Young) were closer to friends than enemies. They both pursued Rick's babysitter, seductress Amber Moore (Adrienne Frantz), which led to a drag race that nearly killed Rick. CJ spent most of 1998 and 1999 as Amber's shoulder to cry on as she became pregnant and married Rick. He also developed a crush on Kimberly Fairchild (Ashley Lyn Cafagna). They went on a few dates but she was more interested in Rick (then played by Justin Torkildsen).

Around this time, Forrester Creations and Spectra Fashions were in a heated conflict over the latest fashion show. C.J. planned to sabotage the model wearing Forrester's final outfit of the night, the showstopper. Unbeknownst to him, this was Kimberly. The lower half of her dress was ripped off by a nail, leaving her in her panties in front of dozens of the press. C.J. was guilt-ridden, but the truth never came out.

Amber was in the middle of a very complicated web of lies about the paternity of her son. The baby's natural mother, her cousin Becky Moore (Marissa Tait), had just arrived in town. To keep her busy, Amber set her up with C.J. On that first date, they made out, but it never amounted to anything.

Months later, Becky had shed her white trash roots for a makeover, as well as getting her son back from Amber, C.J. spent a great deal of time with her. They fell in love quickly, their relationship helping C.J. make the final transition from wisecracking boy to mature, thoughtful man. Unfortunately, Becky was dying of pancreatic cancer. Amber tried to keep the cancer a secret from Becky and everyone else, but broke down and eventually told C.J. Instead of telling her, he proposed marriage, wanting to make her final weeks happy. Becky learned of her cancer minutes before the wedding, but married CJ anyway. She died soon after, at peace, surrounded by her family and friends. Becky wanted C.J. to raise her son, Eric Jr., with Amber. C.J. and Amber shared an apartment. Around this time, C.J.'s sister Macy (Bobbie Eakes) died in a car explosion; he blamed Thorne for her death. Macy left her brother her coffee house, Insomnia.

Shortly after Macy's death, Amber had a party at their apartment and she and C.J. were mistakenly arrested for drug possession. Child Protective Services took the baby away, letting the child live with Rick. The Forresters got a court order to force Amber and Eric Jr. to move moved in with them. Amber persuaded them to let C.J. move in as well. C.J. won temporary custody, allowing the three to move back to their old apartment. He and Amber made plans to marry, since he had fallen in love with her and she admitted to having feelings for him.

The Forresters were desperate to stop the wedding so Rick could be with Amber and raise Eric Jr. They managed to track down Deacon Sharpe (Sean Kanan), Eric Jr.'s biological father, who then interrupted the ceremony to announce that Eric Jr. was his son.

While C.J. believed he and Amber still had a future together, Rick and Stephanie (Susan Flannery) repeatedly urged Amber to realize her best chance for custody was with Rick, that she still had feelings for Rick. Finally, a few weeks later, Amber agreed to move back in with Rick. She told C.J. before a surprise romantic dinner he'd planned for them at Insomnia. C.J. was devastated. With Eric Jr. already being fought over by two fathers, C.J. was forgotten about, and immediately faded into the background.

C.J. came back to town in Spring 2002, with a huge chip on his shoulder for everyone, especially the Forresters. He also began running the coffee shop, Insomnia, again. He was very mean to Bridget Forrester (then played by Jennifer Finnigan), his old friend, when she came into Insomnia looking for a job. Bridget eventually wore C.J. down until he became nice to her and he eventually offered her a place to stay, in the apartment right next to his.

Bridget and C.J. began dating, but not seriously. CJ was very supportive when Bridget started pre-med training. It was there she met Dr. Mark MacClaine (Michael Dietz), her med school mentor. C.J. immediately became jealous of Mark, sensing that Mark had intentions regarding Bridget. After a few months, Mark resigned as Bridget's mentor and began to date her. C.J. was furious to learn from Clarke that Mark was his long-lost half brother.

C.J. again faded into the background, returning briefly in 2004 for his friend Darla's (Schae Harrison) wedding in June and to lend some relationship advice to old friend Amber Moore in September.

In February 2007, C.J. returned to Los Angeles to MC a karaoke night at his café Insomnia and visit his mother Sally, who was not well. Evidently by that time he had resolved his differences with Rick (now played by Kyle Lowder), as the two were friendly toward one another. Later that year, C.J. and his father Clarke, assisted Sally sell Spectra Fashions to Jacqueline Marone. It was revealed that the company now running Spectra had filed for bankruptcy and the title had reverted to Sally, who was now living in France, not wishing to return to Los Angeles. Jackie renamed the company "M. Fashions", hiring Clarke as head designer and returning it to a knock-off firm.

In December 2010, C.J. returns to L.A., revealing that he now resides in San Francisco. C.J. had returned to close down his Insomnia café as the distance from San Francisco to Los Angeles was proving difficult. He stated his mother was sailing around the Caribbean Islands with a number of body builders and there was no longer reason for him to visit Los Angeles. Stephanie Forrester purchased Insomnia from C.J. and asked friend Dayzee Leigh if she'd like to run the café and offer employment to the homeless.

In February 2017, C.J. returns to L.A., revealing that he bought Spectra Fashions back from Jackie Marone at some point between 2012 and 2017. Wanting to sell his family's company to publishing billionaire Bill Spencer, Jr., C.J. is persuaded by his younger cousin, namesake Sally Spectra, to allow her to revive the business. C.J. was unhappy when the new Sally took a page out of his mother's playbooks, and had stolen designs from Forrester Creations. C.J. continues to refuse offers from Bill to sell the building to him.

Adam Banks
Adam Banks is a homeless man who formed a friendship with Stephanie Forrester. He was portrayed by Rod Loomis from 1991 to 1992

Sly Donovan

Irving "Sly" Donovan was portrayed by Brent Jasmer from 1992 to 1996.
Sly Donovan was a bartender at a Malibu hotspot, the Bikini Bar. Along with his manager, Zach Hamilton, Sly met sisters Kristen Forrester and Felicia Forrester; Sly and Zach were taken with them both. Sly received a directive from Felicia's mother, Stephanie Forrester, to keep an eye on Felicia, as Felicia had almost been raped because of Zach's ties to the criminal underworld. As Stephanie was the co-founder of the prestigious fashion design house Forrester Creations, Sly obediently reported back to Stephanie when he learned Zach and Felicia planned to run away together.

As a bartender, Sly got caught up listening to the travails of Felicia's brother, Thorne Forrester, who was the center of a love triangle between his estranged wife, aspiring singer Macy Alexander, and Spencer Publications honcho Karen Spencer. When Thorne moved on with Karen, Sly sent Macy an anonymous note asking to be her date for New Year's; Sly took some heat when the disappointed Macy, who thought the note was from Thorne, berated Sly for worming his way into her life. Nevertheless, Sly became friends with Macy and tried to tell her about his growing feelings in a poem, which she laughed at. Knowing his co-worker Keith Anderson had a much better way with words, Sly had Keith write love poems for Macy, which he passed off as his own. Sly was happy when the passionate prose got Macy's attention.

Sly told Macy he'd take care of her when she started drinking heavily because her plans for a reunion with Thorne fell through. Sly gave Macy a job singing at the bar, which his customers loved. After Sly took a drunk Macy upstairs to his apartment for lovemaking, he overheard Keith telling Macy that Sly was moving too fast; Sly warned Keith not to interfere in his involvement with Macy, especially after Keith sent Macy flowers and more poems. Sly felt Macy was drinking too much and assured her worried mother, Sally Spectra, but let Macy have more alcohol when she got upset over seeing Thorne and Karen together; Sly felt that Macy would stop coming by the bar if he didn't.

Sly fumed when Keith let his little brother, Kevin Anderson, help out at the bar; Sly yelled at Kevin when he bumped into a drunken Macy and broke a tray of glasses. Sly refused to hire Kevin even after Keith told Sly that Kevin was mentally disabled. Sly covered for Macy after she moved into his apartment, watching her lie to the visiting Sally that she was sober. Sly broke up a fight between the drunk Macy and a biker chick, then panicked when Macy stumbled off to the beach by herself. Sly found Macy passed out in an alley and reluctantly agreed to let Thorne intervene. Sly sadly watched the newly-sober Macy move out, since she and Thorne had decided to reconcile.

Sly continued to object to Kevin's presence at the bar. One night after closing, Sly found himself at the mercy of a gun-wielding robber and was impressed when Kevin tackled the crook and saved him. Sly admitted he had been wrong about Kevin and gratefully hired him to work alongside Keith. Sly hosted a party celebrating Macy's sobriety, then received a call that Macy had gotten into a drunk driving accident with Kevin in the car. Sly agonized over Kevin's critical condition and breathed a sigh of relief when Kevin pulled through. Sly joined Kevin and the others visiting a remorseful Macy in the hospital, where Sly admitted that Keith had written all of "his" poems. Sly felt horrible when he was forced to fire Keith and Kevin at the bar owner's behest.

Sly struck up a friendship with the innocent, underage Jessica Forrester. Sly became jealous when he noticed Jessica's crush on Dylan Shaw, a Forrester Creations intern who was seeing Forrester model Ivana Vanderveld. Sly found out that Forrester had a "no dating the models" policy, so he went to Jessica's uncle, Eric Forrester, and reported seeing Dylan and Ivana together, which got Dylan in trouble. At Jessica's seventeenth birthday party, Sly saw that Jessica was upset over Dylan and naïvely downing Jell-O shots, so Sly got the drunk Jessica alone to seduce her, only to be stopped by Dylan, who whisked Jessica away.

Hard times fell upon the Bikini Bar with Macy no longer singing there, and Sly expressed his resentment to Dylan. Sly filled out a job application at the Insomnia Café and sheepishly defended himself when Dylan saw that Sly's given name was Irving. Soon Sly found himself under suspicion for writing Macy threatening "fan" letters which were signed by "Irv", but Sly had an alibi that cleared him of any wrongdoing. Later, with Dylan and Jessica taking things slow in a non-exclusive relationship, Sly saw Dylan kissing older woman Maggie Forrester, who turned out to be Jessica's mother, and told Jessica about it. Sly was pleased when Jessica finally agreed to go out with him. Sly also agreed to have Thorne and Macy's wedding at the Bikini.

Sly knew Jessica wasn't ready for anything heavy, yet gave her beer, took her skinny-dipping, and kissed her repeatedly. Frustrated that Jessica wouldn't have sex with him and tired of being given a hard time by his boss at the Bikini, Sly decided Jessica could be his meal ticket and proposed to her, agreeing to give Jessica time to think as long as she wore his ring. Despite his engagement, Sly fooled around with Jessica's friend, Jasmine Malone, whom he'd just hired at the Bikini. The cocky Sly even told Jasmine about his plans for Jessica, which threatened to unravel when Jessica called off their engagement; Sly barely concealed his anger as he told Jessica he would wait for her. Sly changed course and plotted to get Jessica drunk and poke a hole in a condom so he could get her pregnant and force her into marriage.

Sly took Jessica to a beach party to carry out his alcohol-soaked plan, but got so drunk himself he passed out. Sly was thrilled when Jessica informed him they'd made love and later confirmed that she was pregnant. But Sly found his path to Easy Street blocked when Jessica made him take parenting classes and train for fatherhood on a computerized baby doll that wouldn't stop crying unless Sly figured out what the "baby" needed. Sly kept trying to disable the doll, coming at it with a screwdriver and whacking it against the bar, worrying when Jessica said she would leave him if he didn't start taking his responsibility seriously.

Sly finally conceded defeat and went to Jessica to tell her he'd be a lousy father and that their baby would be better off without him. But on his way out of town, Sly changed his mind; he dressed up in a suit and tie, got an interview at a car dealership, and proudly told Jessica he was going to do right by her and the child. Sly's shock turned to outrage when Jessica told him that she knew about his plan to get her pregnant and that she'd lied about carrying his baby to teach him a lesson. Sly laughed it off but seethed inwardly when his friends made fun of him for being a chump. Sly vowed revenge and followed Jessica to the Café Russe, where Dylan had taken her for a fancy dinner; donning a mask, Sly attacked Jessica as she walked to her car, threatened to kill her, and raped her.

Sly reveled in Jessica's resultant suffering. When the skittish Jessica finally came to the Bikini with Dylan after weeks of isolation, Sly comforted his victim, who ended up arguing with Dylan. Sly asked Jessica for a dance and didn't deny it when the way he touched Jessica made her realize Sly was the one who had violated her. Sly met Jasmine for dinner at her place and laid on the sex appeal, whipping off his shirt. When Jasmine's attitude changed after seeing the birthmark on his back that Jessica had told her about, he realized Jasmine knew what he did to Jessica.

Sly waited in the back seat of Jessica's car and stopped her and Jasmine from driving to the police station, instead forcing them to go to the Bikini, where Sly tied them up. Sly ignored the girls' pleading and lorded his power over Jessica, proudly declaring that he had taken her innocence, which she could never get back. Sly scoffed when Jessica offered to get Sly help and swore she wouldn't press charges if he'd let her and Jasmine go, but Sly told them they were going up in flames, as he could get rid of them and collect insurance on the bar at the same time. As Sly started the fire, he caught Dylan untying Jasmine and Jessica and brawled with him in the bar. Sly fell onto a burning table when Dylan threw a chair at him, then burned to death after a blazing beam fell on him from the ceiling and the Bikini Bar exploded.

Zachary "Zach" Hamilton
Zachary "Zach" Hamilton was portrayed by Michael Watson in 1992.

Connor Davis
Connor Davis was portrayed by Scott Thompson Baker from 1993 to 1998. The character returned to the show in 2000, 2002, and 2005.

Jessica Forrester
Jessica Forrester was portrayed by Maitland Ward from 1994 to 1996.

Dylan Shaw
Dylan Shaw was portrayed by Dylan Neal from 1994 to 1996.

Ivana Vanderveld
Ivana Vanderveld was portrayed by Monika Schnarre from 1994 to 1995.

Maggie Forrester
Maggie Forrester was portrayed by actress Barbara Crampton from 1995 to 1998.

Jasmine Malone
Jasmine Malone was portrayed by Lark Voorhies from 1995 to 1996.

Jasmine Malone was an aspiring fashion designer who interviewed at knockoff fashion house Spectra Fashions for a job. Jasmine and Spectra's owner, Sally Spectra, took an immediate dislike to each other and Jasmine left in a huff, but got hurt when Spectra's rickety elevator plunged three floors. While in the hospital, Jasmine considered suing Sally, who ended up being Jasmine's roommate when she was shot by deranged designer Anthony Armando. Jasmine and Sally continued to bicker, though Jasmine softened when Sally's tailor and good friend, Saul Feinberg, asked Jasmine to ease off. Knowing Spectra needed a new designer, Jasmine snuck one of her sketches into a pile Sally had received from other prospects; Jasmine was thrilled when Sally liked her work and offered her the position.

Jasmine became a confidante in the romantic entanglements of her friends Dylan Shaw, Jessica Forrester, and Michael Lai. Jasmine was confused when Sally presented her with seemingly complete designs and asked her to alter them. After Spectra produced a collection from Jasmine's alterations and set up a showing, Jasmine found out that Sally had stolen the original sketches from rival fashion house Forrester Creations, which specialized in couture. Jasmine's designs were pulled from the Spectra showing when Forrester's lead designer, Eric Forrester, proposed to Sally on his runway. Jasmine was furious and felt that Sally had made her the fall guy for the stolen designs, so she quit Spectra.

Jasmine got a job at Malibu hotspot the Bikini Bar, where she immediately took a shine to bartender Irving "Sly" Donovan. Jasmine pooh-poohed Dylan and Michael's warnings to stay away from Sly, and continued seeing him even after he admitted he had proposed to Jessica. When fellow former Spectra employee Dylan needed work, Jasmine suggested he check out the Beverly Hills Hideaway, a strip club. Jasmine and Michael witnessed Dylan's stripping début from the front row, which Jasmine helped keep a secret from Dylan's girlfriend, Jessica, who had broken off her engagement to Sly.

Jasmine kept another secret: she knew Sly was planning to get Jessica drunk and have sex with her using a faulty condom so he could get her pregnant and live off her money, but Jasmine said nothing to her friend because Sly was still willing to see her on the side. When Jessica indeed got pregnant and made him train on a computerized baby doll, Jasmine and the other waitresses at the Bikini became annoyed because Sly couldn't make the "baby" quit crying by figuring out what it needed. But Jasmine's annoyance turned to amusement when Jessica began tallying up how much money they'd need for their child because her rich family had cut her off; Jasmine whipped out a calculator and watched Sly turn white as a ghost.

Jasmine counseled Dylan when he started stripping at private parties and was offered $10,000 to have sex with a client, which would help him pay off his tuition at the prestigious Design Academy. Jasmine was surprised when Dylan reported he'd finally told Jessica about his job, and that while Jessica had been upset, she now wanted to be in attendance at Dylan's last performance; Jessica cheered Dylan on with her friends. Jasmine quit the Bikini Bar after Sly, who realized he wasn't cut out to be a father, left town; Jasmine admitted to Michael that she knew Sly had no redeeming qualities but loved him anyway. However, when Sly came back and learned that Jessica had only pretended to be pregnant to teach Sly a lesson, Jasmine lent the furious Sly an ear, annoying him more because she seemed to be on Jessica's side.

Jessica took both Sly and her job back and asked Sly if they could take things slow, especially since Jasmine was having to defend Sly to her friends. Jasmine comforted Sly when his buddies made fun of him for being duped by Jessica, who had been very distant in recent weeks. Jasmine couldn't believe it when Jessica admitted she'd been raped and suspected Sly of violating her; Jasmine was sure of Sly's innocence. But when Jasmine had Sly over for dinner and he whipped off his shirt, she saw the birthmark that Jessica had told her about and realized she was telling the truth.

Jasmine ran to Jessica, and together they agreed to go to the police. On the way to the station, Jasmine panicked when Sly popped out of the back seat and forced Jessica to drive them to the Bikini. As Sly tied them up, Jasmine pleaded with Sly not to hurt them, but all Sly cared about was getting back at Jessica for humiliating him. Jasmine was terrified when Sly declared he was going to set the bar on fire with her and Jessica inside and collect the insurance; as Sly started the blaze, Jasmine and Jessica were rescued by Dylan. Jasmine watched helplessly as Sly and Dylan's fight ended with Sly falling onto a burning table and catching fire. Jasmine was last seen escaping the Bikini with Jessica and Dylan before it exploded; she has not been seen nor mentioned since 1996.

Michael Lai
Michael Lai was portrayed by Lindsay Price from 1995 to 1997.

Megan Conley
Megan Conley was portrayed by Maeve Quinlan from 1995 to 2006.

Dr. Brian Carey
Dr. Brian Carey was portrayed by Kin Shriner from 1995 to 1996.

Grant Chambers
Grant Chambers was portrayed by Charles Grant from 1996 to 1998.

Alicia Cortéz
Alicia Cortéz was portrayed by Ivonne Coll from 1996 to 1997.

Claudia Cortéz
Claudia Cortéz was portrayed by Lilly Melgar from 1996 to 1997.

Hunter Jones
Hunter Jones was portrayed by Tristan Rogers in 1997.

Bradley Baker

Bradley Baker is a police chief of Los Angeles. He is always involved with Forrester, Logan and Spencer families when one of them have an accident. He has a son, Charlie. Baker is portrayed by Dan Martin.

Adam Alexander

Adam Alexander is the former lover of Sally Spectra, and the father of Macy Alexander and Kimberly Fairchild. He was portrayed by Michael Swan from 1998 to 2003.

Rebecca "Becky" Moore
Becky Moore is the cousin of Amber Moore. She was portrayed by Marissa Tait from 1999 to 2000.

Tawny Moore
Tawny Moore is the mother of Amber Moore and April Knight. She was portrayed by Andrea Evans from 1999 to 2000, and again from 2010 to 2011. She also appeared briefly on The Young and the Restless in early 2010.

Giovanni Lorenzano
Giovanni Lorenzano was portrayed by Victor Alfieri from 1999 to 2000, and again in 2004 and 2009.

Morgan DeWitt
Morgan DeWitt was portrayed by Sarah Buxton from 2000 to 2001, and again in 2005.

Antonio Domínguez
Antonio Domínguez was portrayed by Paulo Benedeti from 2001 to 2002, and again from 2012 and 2013, and in 2017.

Zende Forrester Domínguez

Zende Forrester Dominguez is a fictional character from the CBS soap opera The Bold and the Beautiful. The character was played by Daniel E. Smith on a recurring basis from 2001 to 2002 and made guest appearances in 2005 and then by Rome Flynn, as a series regular, since June 29, 2015. In August 2017, Flynn announced he would leave the role of his own decision and makes his last appearance on September 8, 2017. In July 2020, Daytime Confidential announced Delon de Metz had been cast in the role; he made his first appearance on October 7, 2020.

While honeymooning in Africa, newly married Kristen Forrester and Antonio "Tony" Dominguez noticed that they had lost a roll of film. A mysterious boy showed up with the film to return it. As they began to talk to him they formed a bond with him. The boy, named Zende, invited them to visit him before they left the country.
Kristen and Antonio were shocked to discover that Zende had been orphaned when both parents died of AIDS. Zende had lived at an orphanage with his younger brother, but sadly, his brother also died of the disease. To help pay his way, Zende worked around the orphanage and helped take care of the younger children. Kristen and Tony discovered when Zende became too old to live in the orphanage he would probably end up on the streets or working anywhere he could find work.

On their return to Los Angeles, Kristen and Tony admitted that Zende had never left their thoughts. They had both been drafting letters to send him. Since Antonio had been battling HIV himself, he felt a special connection to Zende; the couple saw this as the first chance to have a family of their own. They decided to rush back to Africa and start adoption proceedings immediately. They legally adopted young Zende, choosing to give him both of their surnames.

Zende went to live with Kristen and Tony, who have since left Los Angeles (with Zende) and are currently living in Florida.
In 2015, after a ten-year absence, Zende returned to Los Angeles and is happily greeted by his uncle Ridge Forrester. Zende decides to follow in the footsteps of his family and is hired as an intern at Forrester Creations, along with Nicole Avant, whom Zende takes a liking to. He attends the wedding of his uncle Rick Forrester and Nicole's sister Maya Avant as her date. When Nicole tells him that his cousin Thomas Forrester unexpectedly kissed her, Zende is not fazed by it. In fact, he asks Nicole out on a date and even gives her a kiss. They then decide to officially become a couple. He even supports her when she decides to be Rick and Maya's surrogate despite objections from her parents.

Sofia Alonso
Sofia Alonso is a former Spectra Creations model. She is the confidante and former lover of Antonio Dominguez. She was portrayed by Sandra Vidal from 2001 to 2003.

Erica Lovejoy

Erica Lovejoy is the daughter of Sheila Carter and James Warwick. Her birthname was Mary Carter Warwick. After being portrayed by a series of child actors in 1997 and 1998, the role was played by Courtnee Draper from April to October 2002.

Mark Maclaine

Mark Maclaine is the son of Clarke Garrison and Margo Lynley. The role was portrayed by Michael Dietz from 2002 to 2005.

Tricia Quick
Tricia Quick was played by Tamara Davies from 2002 to 2003. She is a doctor.

Ziggy Deadmarsh
The role of Ziggy Deadmarsh was played by Matt Borlenghi in 2002.

Samantha Kelly
Samantha Kelly was played by Sydney Penny from 2003 to 2005.

April Knight
April Knight is the twin sister of Amber Moore. As with Amber, the role was portrayed by Adrienne Frantz in 2003.

Massimo Marone

Massimo Marone IV is a fictional character from the CBS soap opera The Bold and the Beautiful. He was portrayed by Joseph Mascolo.

Brief Character History

Massimo Marone attended college at Northwestern University in Evanston, Illinois, with Stephanie Douglas, Eric Forrester, and Beth Henderson. Massimo dated Stephanie prior to her dating Eric, who was involved with Beth. Stephanie got pregnant and married Eric; Massimo went on to build the shipping conglomerate Marone Industries.

Massimo arrived in Los Angeles to expand his business and reconnect with Stephanie, who had stayed in touch with Massimo since her first divorce from Eric. Massimo ran afoul of Eric, co-founder of design house Forrester Creations, and denied Eric's contention that Marone Industries was linked to the mob. Massimo knew Stephanie wanted to be rid of Eric's ex-wife, Brooke Logan, who was now pursuing Stephanie's married son, Ridge Forrester; when Massimo blamed Eric for Stephanie's problems with Brooke, Massimo found Eric's fist in his face. Still enamored of Stephanie, Massimo offered to get Brooke out of the way; Massimo located Brooke's father, Stephen Logan, in Paris and paid Stephen $5 million to feign health problems in order to convince Brooke to join him overseas. Massimo gained an enemy in Ridge when his machinations were discovered.

Massimo and Stephanie reminisced about a final evening they'd shared before Stephanie married Eric. Massimo called 9-1-1 when Ridge confronted Massimo in his office and hurt himself badly, after which Stephanie began acting strangely. Massimo was stunned when Stephanie confessed that blood work revealed Massimo was Ridge's father, not Eric. Massimo was thrilled until Stephanie swore him to secrecy; instead, Massimo decided to groom Ridge, who was having problems at Forrester, to take over Marone Industries. To force Ridge into coming over to him, Massimo trained Ridge's half-brother, Rick Forrester, to compete against Ridge in the boardroom.

Massimo romanced longtime friend Sally Spectra to keep her from discovering Ridge's paternity, then told Stephanie if he couldn't have her, he would have Ridge. Massimo hired Ridge at Marone and made him his sole heir. Getting nowhere with Stephanie, Massimo met a mysterious woman in a bar and had a tryst with her, granting her request to take her out of the country. But Massimo got the shock of his life when Stephanie heard the woman's voice on Massimo's answering machine and realized he had been seeing Sheila Carter, whose extensive criminal history included trying to kill Stephanie. Massimo and Stephanie rescued Rick's wife, Amber Moore, who had been framed and kidnapped by Sheila to clear the way for Sheila's daughter, Erica Lovejoy, with Rick.

In Portofino, Italy, Massimo fumed over the growing closeness between Brooke and Ridge, whose wife, Taylor Hayes, had just died from a gunshot wound sustained by Sheila. Complaining to Brooke's daughter, Bridget Forrester, Massimo let it slip that Ridge was his son. When Bridget realized that she and Ridge weren't related after all, Massimo encouraged Bridget to pursue Ridge to get him away from Brooke; as extra insurance, Massimo tasked Brooke's ex-lover, Deacon Sharpe, with seducing Brooke away from Ridge. But after Stephanie tried to discourage Ridge and Bridget's burgeoning feelings by sending medical student Bridget away for education in Copenhagen, Massimo told an incredulous Ridge that Eric wasn't his father.

One of Massimo's tankers went aground, so Massimo went to Mexico to confront its captain, Nick Payne. Massimo met Nick's mother, Jackie Payne, and didn't immediately recognize her, but when Massimo saw that he and Nick wore the same signet ring, Massimo remembered having a fling with Jackie and found out Nick was his son only after Jackie admitted it during a plane crash. Massimo hired Nick at Marone and tried to get him interested in Brooke, who was reuniting with Ridge. Massimo had Eric removed by security guards after the furious Eric learned the truth about Ridge's paternity.

Bonding over Nick, Massimo and Jackie renewed their romance and got married. Soon after, Ridge was kidnapped; Massimo tracked him to South America and was shocked to find Ridge being held captive by Sheila. Before a mêlée ensued in which Ridge was presumed dead, Massimo was introduced to his apparent daughter with Sheila, Diana Carter. Massimo celebrated when Ridge turned up alive, but worried his family would be torn apart after Nick and Brooke's "grief sex" left her pregnant. Elsewhere, Massimo had his hands full with his rebellious nephew, club owner Oscar Marone, whose illegal business practices were responsible for the death of singer Macy Alexander.

As Massimo refereed his sons fighting over Brooke, Massimo became jealous of Jackie's friendship with Eric and hired Deacon to dig up dirt on him. Massimo then brought to town James Warwick, a psychiatrist friend of the Forresters, to advise Brooke in her choice between Nick and Ridge. Massimo began to suspect Jackie of having an affair and caught her on the phone with Deacon, so Massimo held a gun to Deacon's head, then hired him to find out who Jackie's lover was. On the day of Nick's wedding to Brooke, Massimo and Nick were arrested for bribing foreign agents based on information Ridge found on Nick's computer, but they were ultimately released for lack of proof.

When it came out that Ridge was the father of Brooke's baby after all – and that Jackie knew about it – Massimo served Jackie with divorce papers, but soon forgave her and bought her a chain of department stores, which he rebranded Jackie M. Massimo was about to make Deacon president of Jackie M when he learned of Deacon's affair with Jackie and suffered a stroke, rendering him unable to speak. Massimo plotted his revenge as Deacon, who believed Massimo was unaware of his surroundings, flaunted his affair with Jackie in front of Massimo and drugged Jackie to taunt him. After Nick arranged for Massimo to undergo experimental treatments utilizing electrical impulses, Massimo recovered and tormented Deacon with a gun, then laughed as he revealed it was loaded with blanks.

Massimo divorced Jackie, then spiked recovering alcoholic Deacon's drink as revenge, causing Deacon to fall off the wagon. Massimo supported Nick when he decided to move on with Bridget, then flew off to Italy to rescue Ridge, who had been kidnapped by obsessive ex-girlfriend Morgan DeWitt. Massimo reestablished a friendship with Jackie, but ultimately decided not to reunite with her. While standing in as a witness for Stephanie while she removed stocks from her safe, Massimo discovered paperwork that named Stephanie as the sole owner of Forrester Creations; Massimo contacted Genoa City billionaire Katherine Chancellor, who confirmed a trust established by Stephanie's father, John Douglas. Massimo was on hand as Stephanie kneed Eric in the groin for his deception.

Massimo thought he finally had a chance with Stephanie until she went back to Eric. After Ridge had a heart attack, Massimo changed his tune and threatened Brooke, warning her to steer clear of Nick, who wanted Brooke back. Massimo bribed Forrester secretary Megan Conley into helping him frame Jackie for tax fraud, tax evasion, and money laundering, then promised Jackie he'd clear her if she helped keep Brooke and Nick apart for Ridge. Massimo faced Nick's wrath after he caught Massimo and Megan conspiring together, and Massimo was removed as CEO of Marone Industries.

Massimo disappeared from the canvas after he and Stephanie failed to stop Nick's wedding to Brooke by publicizing nude outtake photos from her Brooke's Bedroom lingerie line. Though Massimo hasn't been seen since 2006, he is often referenced, usually to reiterate that Ridge is Massimo's son and thus not a Forrester.

Nick Marone

Dominick "Nick" Marone (born Dominick "Nick" Payne) is a fictional character who was originated by Jack Wagner on March 28, 2003. Much of Nick's storylines has revolved around his relationships with Bridget Forrester, her mother Brooke Logan, Brooke's sisters Donna and Katie Logan, and Brooke's longtime rival Taylor Hayes. Wagner departed without on-screen explanation, following speculation that he was taken off his contract.

Nick Payne arrives in town after a shipwreck. Soon, he is romancing Brooke Logan. This eventually puts him at odds with her fiancé, Ridge Forrester. Their rivalry is exacerbated when his mother, Jacqueline Payne, reveals to Nick that he is the son of his employer, billionaire shipping magnate Massimo Marone making him Ridge's half-brother. Brooke chooses to marry Ridge. They go on their honeymoon in South America, where Ridge is kidnapped by a group of thugs working for Sheila Carter, a criminal who killed Ridge's wife Taylor Hayes. While saving Ridge, Brooke and Nick end up also being held captive by Sheila, demanding gold from Massimo. Ridge falls into a furnace and is presumed dead. While grieving, Brooke and Nick have sex. It is later revealed that Ridge is alive. Brooke realizes she is pregnant and is unsure if Ridge or Nick is the father. A DNA test reveals Nick is the father but months its later revealed that Ridge is actually the father. Brooke nearly marries Nick but the wedding is stopped by Ridge. Nick later had a brief romance with Ridge's half-sister, Felicia Forrester. She returned to L.A with a son called Dominick. Later, Nick begins to romance Bridget Forrester. They get married (a small interruption in their ceremony which reveals that Taylor Hayes was alive stops the initial wedding) at the Forrester Mansion. Bridget becomes pregnant, but finds out that Nick and her own mother, Brooke, had begun an affair. She faked an abortion. Nick and Bridget's stillborn baby Nicole was born in early 2006. They split up soon after. Nick, wanting Brooke back, stopped her wedding to Ridge and succeeded. Brooke and Nick finally married soon afterward. On one of the fashion show television shows Ridge purposely gave Brooke a scandalizing kiss causing Nick to lose it. Ridge continues his constant sexual advances to Brooke to try to break up Nick and Brooke and decides to put Brooke's sister Donna Logan on as lead model for Brooke's Bedroom to make Brooke jealous. Brooke leaves Nick in their bedroom in a huff when she sees Donna on television scantily clad and representing Brooke's Bedroom and goes to Ridge's house to confront him about it. Nick later slept with Bridget. Also during this time, Jackie falls off the staircase at the Forrester mansion and falsely claims that Stephanie pushed her. Nick blackmails Eric Forrester and the rest of the Forresters into selling him Forrester Creations or Stephanie will face charges. Brooke, furious at Nick's treatment of the Forresters, sells him her stock as well, ends her marriage to Nick and returns to Ridge.

After many problems, Nick underwent therapy with Taylor. He told her about Jackie's days in Seattle, when she became a prostitute to support herself and Nick. Stephanie overhears Taylor recording her notes of Nick's session and publicly announces Jackie's past at the first Forrester Creations fashion show under Nick's management. Much turmoil followed between Nick and the Forresters. Despite the growing animosity between the Forresters and the Marones, Taylor remained Nick's friend. After Taylor's relationship with Thorne ended. Taylor and Nick almost automatically fell in love and married each other. Nick and Taylor decide to have a child but her eggs are not viable; so she needed a donor. Soon after the birth, it was revealed the baby's donor (due to a mix up) was Brooke. Taylor had difficulty being in a family with Nick and Brooke's biological baby, Jack. Taylor begins drinking again, they divorce and shared joint custody. Taylor later handed the baby over to Brooke. Nick and Bridget give their relationship another chance. They get married for the second time in July 2008. Later, Bridget's aunt, Katie Logan, undergoes heart issues after being shot by Storm Logan. During this difficult time, Nick and Katie had sex resulting in a pregnancy. Nick left briefly for business. Bridget and Nick once again re-connect in 2009 (months after their divorce) and remarry. They decide to have a baby via surrogate, who is a lady named Aggie. After Aggie and Bridget get into another verbal altercation, Aggie falls down and collapses, losing the baby.

Aggie developed feelings for Nick herself. Bridget later falls pregnant after a one-night stand with Owen Knight. Nick and Bridget divorce and he begins a flirtation with Aggie which later ended after Nick was diagnosed with cancer, but was later revealed to be in good health. Nick resurfaces as he helps Taylor in the Forrester family dilemma when the Forrester jet crashes into the Atlantic carrying Brooke and Thomas. He helps Ridge to find his family. Nick later receives an anonymous message from a woman asking to meet him in the Jackie M steam room, and is shocked when he discovers that it is Stephanie's sister, Pamela Douglas. Pam informs him that Stephen Logan left her and confesses to finding Nick increasingly attractive, but Nick initially rejects her advances. Meanwhile, Jackie M is facing a tough situation. After firing Amber Moore for stealing Forrester designs, Jackie begins to worry as they do not have a designer. Jackie subsequently convinces Nick to spend some time with Pam in return for her stealing designs from Eric. Nick then begins a relationship with Donna, after she splits up with her husband, Justin Barber. However, she soon finds out about Nick and Pam's scheme and breaks up with him.

Oscar Marone
Oscar Marone was played by Brian Gaskill from September 2003 through August 2004. Gaskill was hired after the ABC Daytime soap opera Port Charles was cancelled, where he played Rafe Kovich. In 2003, Gaskill described Oscar as the black sheep of the family, "He's not necessarily a bad guy, but he's not all good, either. He might seem kind of cold sometimes, but I think his heart's in the right place. To be honest I'm not 100 percent sure who he is until I've played him a while. Brad Bell (executive producer) keeps things pretty close. You never know where this guy might end up."

Caitlin Ramirez
Caitlin Ramirez was played by Kayla Ewell from January 22, 2004, through 2005.

Jarrett Maxwell

Jarrett Maxwell is a fashion reporter for Eye on Fashion and an employee of Spencer Publications. Jarrett is an established member of the fashion industry reporting on the latest fashion lines of Forrester Creations and is very friendly with the Forrester family. Jarrett is also friendly with his superiors Bill Spencer Jr. and Karen Spencer, and was one of the very few people to know Karen was gay before she came out publicly.

Dante Damiano
Dante Damiano was played by Antonio Sabàto Jr. from 2005 through 2006. He fathered a child with Felicia Forrester, and was in a relationship with Bridget Forrester.

Gabriela Moreno
Gabriela Moreno is the daughter of Stephanie Forrester's maid, Helen. Shanelle Workman originated the role on March 24, 2005. Gabriela has a green card marriage with Thomas Forrester. Workman was let go of her contract later that year, last appearing on October 27, 2005.

Ann Douglas
Ann Douglas is the mother of Stephanie Forrester and Pamela Douglas. Betty White originated the role during a ten-day run spanning December 2006 through January 2007, later returning in 2008 and 2009. Stephanie and Ann had been estranged since Stephanie was abused by her father and Ann did nothing to stop it. White described her character's entrance, "Ann has spent 30 years denying any of this (her daughter's abuse) had anything to do with her. She has to face some deep truths. It was quite dramatic, which is a switch for me. The most dramatic work I had done was some Ellery Queen. It was a delightful exercise to dig a little deeper and see where it took me." The child abuse story arc was one of many that won the series critical acclaim for handling social issues. White reprised the role in November 2009 when Ann returns to make amends with her family before she dies. White made television history by leading an all-female cast.

Harry Jackson
Harry Jackson was played by Ben Hogestyn in 2006. Harry debuted on August 28, 2006. He arrives looking for Nick Marone (Jack Wagner), to confront him about his father's death. In December 2006, Hogestyn was dropped to recurring status and did not appear since.

Christian Ramirez
Dr. Christian Ramirez is the brother of Hector Ramirez (Lorenzo Lamas) and was played by Mario Lopez in 2006. Upon assuming the role, Lopez stated, "As someone who is part of the Latin community, I am very proud to play a character like Christian Ramirez because he's more than a role; he's a positive role model for people to look up to. He's a good man who wants to do good things. And he's strong. He proved that you can overcome anything to be the person you want to be."

Shane McGrath
Shane McGrath was originated by Dax Griffin on September 12, 2006. The character is killed off in 2007, originally thought to be shot by Nick Marone but was shot by Ridge Forrester.

Constantine Parros
Constantine Parros was played by Constantine Maroulis in 2007, first appearing on March 15. Maroulis was the sixth-place finalist on the fourth season of the reality television series American Idol. Speaking of his casting, Maroulis stated, "I think they wanted to gear the audience a little younger this summer and sort of shake things up a bit." When asked by Entertainment Weekly if his character would show the "staple Constantine stare," he replied, "Definitely. It might have been written into one of the stage directions. The script said, 'Constantine gives her 'the look." I laughed out loud, of course." Maroulis also used the opportunity to promote his upcoming album, Constantine. He performed "Everybody Loves, Everybody Cries" and "A Girl Like You" on the series.

Constantine Parros is a music producer and former international rock star. He becomes infatuated with Phoebe Forrester (MacKenzie Mauzy) and pursues producing her record. In August 2007 he participates in the Boldface Challenge concert. The series conducted an online poll where fans voted between a performance from Constantine and Phoebe, and one from Phoebe and Rick Forrester (then-Kyle Lowder). During the concert, Constantine is joined by Elliott Yamin, third runner up in season five of American Idol, and singer-songwriter Jon McLaughlin. Each sing real-life singles; Yamin performs "Wait For You," McLaughlin performs "Beautiful Disaster" and Maroulis performs "Fading Into You".

Owen Knight 

Owen Knight is a fictional character from the American CBS soap opera The Bold and the Beautiful. Created by Bradley Bell and Kay Alden, Owen was portrayed by Brandon Beemer and made his debut on July 2, 2008. Beemer was dropped to recurring status in January 2012, but continued to appear up until February 29, 2012, when he left the show altogether.

Storylines

Owen Knight arrives in Los Angeles in July 2008 to see a client of his, Marcus Walton. Marcus hired him from a want ad online to find his biological mother. Marcus doesn't really know Owen since most of their correspondence have been online. Owen meets Donna Forrester and is instantly attracted to her. Donna's stepdaughter Felicia Forrester (Lesli Kay) notices this and offers Owen $200,000 to seduce Donna in an attempt to get Stephanie Forrester (her mother) and Eric Forrester (her father) back together. He appears to be intrigued by the offer and tells her he'll think about it. However, after meeting Donna he becomes enamored by her love and devotion to Eric and comes back and rejects the deal. Felicia is outraged and outraged even more when Owen tells Donna what Felicia did. In response to this new information, Donna fires Felicia, Thorne and Ridge Forrester since she didn't believe she could trust them while her husband was in a coma. Felicia was outraged by Owen and slapped him for telling Donna her plan. The Forresters therefore, decide to make it their goal to get Donna out of their father's life once their father comes out of the coma.
Owen was made Donna's assistant (detective and paralegal background), due to his growing admiration of her; and he encourages her to keep Ridge, Felicia and Thorne out of the company since she can't trust them. He works as a voice of reason to her.  Owen is shown to be a dissembler, causing friction among the Logans and Forresters due to his influence over Donna.  Despite their collaboration to find his mother, Marcus is starting to question Owen's motives in regards to his mother. He believes Owen is manipulating Donna and confronts his mother. Donna listens to her son and begins to question Owen. Donna starts to become suspicious of Owen also since he seems too good to be true and becomes concerned when he tells her he loves her. She and he share a few kisses and she decides that it's best if she lets him go. He agrees and leaves the company but doesn't leave Los Angeles.

It was later discovered that Eric didn't have a heart attack, but he had been poisoned with potassium chloride which had been put in a bottle of gin that Eric had a drink from before he had sex with his wife. Thanks to some detective work by step-siblings Marcus and Bridget, the truth came out, and it could well be Owen whom the suspicion could fall on.  On August 22, Owen was arrested for attempting to murder Eric Forrester. He was almost the target of attack by Ridge and Thorne, and even Donna was angry with his actions. However, he insisted that he was taking the blame for someone else, that person being Donna, who was on the verge of being arrested until he lied and said he poisoned Eric Forrester.  His suspicions were indeed correct when it was discovered that Donna's arch-enemy, Pamela Douglas (Alley Mills), was the one who accidentally poisoned Eric (in an attempt to stop the lovemaking between Eric and Donna; thinking this would lead to Eric returning to her sister Stephanie) and then saved her when she tried to kill her with a shotgun; and a bear.
Donna became more enamored by Owen's knight saving act and they commenced to kiss as Eric Forrester was awaking slowly from his coma.  Stephanie and Ridge send Donna and Owen both on a trip after Stephanie catches Donna and Owen in the bedroom kissing. However, they haven't been officially intimate in spite of the appearance. Recently Donna and Owen returned from their business trip unaware that a recovered Eric is down the hall from Kristen's old bedroom. Owen commences to kiss Donna and get her to try to move on with her life without Eric. Eric hears noise and catches them kissing each other.

In light of Eric's recovery Donna tells Owen that she can't be with him because she loves her husband. He refuses to leave and tells Donna that he loves her. He grabs her into a passionate kiss to which she responds. Owen continues to be an ambiguous thorn in Donna's side. She loves her husband but Owen captivates her passions.
After discovering that Owen attempted to sleep with Donna her aunt, Bridget Forrester walks over and throws a glass of wine in Owen's face. And then walks away to eat a salad while sitting outside at a restaurant. Owen confronts her and tells her that he really does love Donna and Bridget breaks out into a tirade about men not being able to keep it in their pants to which Owen replies okay, "She can be down on men." And "he can be down on women." He continues to flirt with her.

Later Stephanie confronts him at a restaurant and wants him to tell her that he had an affair with Donna to which he denies stating that it's not as if he didn't try hard enough, but that she really does love Eric. Donna catches this and assumes Stephanie and Owen plotted the seduction attempt. And she relays to him that she "never wants to see him again." 
Owen tries to attract Bridget, but nothing comes of that; however, he, along with Marcus and Pam Douglas, confront Rick on his attraction to Steffy.  Owen, Pam and Marcus don't trust Rick, as they think he had a hand in her sister, Phoebe's death, and they, like her father, Ridge, want to protect Steffy.

Having been fired from Forrester Creations, Owen got a job at Jackie M Designs. He started a fling with Jacqueline Marone. He also was dating Bridget, but this was short-lived since Bridget was still harboring feelings for her ex-husband Nick Marone and got back together with him. Jackie and Owen also got together, much to the irritation of Nick, who was convinced that Owen was only interested in Jackie for her money. Nick tried his best to break Owen and Jackie up, and even managed to convince Jackie to fire Owen. However, Owen countered with a proposal of marriage, which freaked Nick out even more. Nick vowed never to let Jackie marry Owen. Eventually, Owen took Jackie on a surprise vacation in Hawaii, unaware that Nick and Bridget were honeymooning there. Owen planned a wedding for Jackie, but Bridget found out about it and told Nick. Nick tried to stop the wedding, but he arrived too late.

Later, Bridget and Owen have a one-night stand after she loses her and Nick's baby. Owen gets Bridget pregnant, but while Bridget is aware of this, she chooses to keep it a secret until Aggie Jones finds out, forcing her to tell the truth.  Nick subsequently divorces her.

Bridget and Owen's baby was born in October 2010. Bridget confessed that she had fallen in love with Owen and wanted to start a family with him. Although Owen appreciated her honesty, he stayed true to his wife and again proclaimed his love for her, leaving Bridget heartbroken. Nick eventually fires both Bridget and Owen from Jackie M Designs, although he later hires Owen back.

Jackie eventually ended the marriage, realizing that Owen belonged with his family and sorrowfully asking him for a divorce. Owen asked Bridget to move in with him, but their relationship ended in February 2012, allowing Owen to return to his marriage with Jackie. Jackie and Owen later sold their house and moved to New York to be with Bridget and Logan.

Casper Knight
Owen Knight's twin brother, who appeared in three episodes in 2009, was portrayed by Brandon Beemer .

Graham Darros
Graham Darros was played by Justin Baldoni in 2010. Executive producer and headwriter Bradley Bell announced the role in late 2009, describing Graham as, "a well-known fashion photographer who is hired by Steffy to work for Forrester Creations. It soon becomes evident that he has a sinister and mysterious past with another major character." He spoke of Baldoni as "a compelling young actor who will be able to bring forth the intensity that is essential for the character of Graham."

Beverly
Beverly is portrayed by Gina Rodriguez since 2011. Beverly was named for Beverly Hills before being placed in foster care and was a friend of formerly homeless Dayzee Leigh. Stephanie Forrester, who befriended Dayzee on the street and bought the Insomnia coffeehouse for Dayzee to run, was impressed with Beverly's determination to make something of herself and convinced her family to hire Beverly as an intern at Forrester Creations. Hope Logan caught the inexperienced Beverly taking photos of Forrester gowns with her cell phone. Later, when the dresses showed up on Jackie M's runway, Hope and Stephanie accused Beverly of selling their collection to their competitor, prompting Beverly to run away. Stephanie's sister, Pam Douglas, the real thief, felt bad that Beverly was taking the fall for her. Jackie Marone affirmed Beverly's innocence to Stephanie, noting that the intern hadn't worked at Forrester long enough to steal an entire line. Realizing their mistake, Stephanie and Hope tracked Beverly and Dayzee to a bus in Whittier; Stephanie stood in front of it to get it to stop. An angry Beverly dashed into a gated apartment complex. Dayzee explained it was transitional housing for kids who had aged out of the foster care system. Stephanie wore Beverly down by recounting her experience as an abused child, even admitting she'd gotten pregnant and married Eric as a way out of her father's house. Beverly agreed to return to Forrester, then introduced Stephanie and Hope to other residents of the home. After meeting Rick Forrester, Beverly gushed to Dayzee that he was "definitely into" her. Though a jealous Amber Moore threatened Beverly to stay away, Beverly held her own. She later disappeared from the canvas but was presumed to still work at Forrester.

Othello

Othello is a current DJ and friend of Rick Forrester. He showed up for a party that Caroline Spencer made Rick take her to even though he was with Maya and took her also. Othello asked Rick about his girlfriend Caroline, but Rick introduced Othello to his new girlfriend Maya. He DJ'd for a party that Bill Spencer Jr. set Jesse Graves up at who was the reason Maya went to jail so Caroline, his niece, could be with Rick again. Othello then showed up to DJ the Hope for the Future line that would cement Rick's role as president.

Rick used Othello to lie to his sister Hope Logan that Hope fiancée Liam Spencer slept with his ex-wife Steffy Forrester the night before his wedding to Hope. Othello was reluctant to go along with Rick's manipulation and refused to directly lie to Hope but did confirm Rick's lies.

Othello showed up to help Bill and Brooke Logan climb a mountain in Aspen, Colorado. Bill slipped and was dangling but he saved himself from falling.

Othello questioned Oliver Jones about his relationship with Alexandria Forrester right after Ridge Forrester almost fired him, thinking Oliver found a way to keep his job.

Othello attended a Forrester meeting and it was said that Othello was the music director for Forrester. Othello was surprised to learn that Quinn Fuller was gone from the company.

In December 2014, Maya invited Othello over to her new apartment that Rick bought her. Othello was surprised at how cocky she was claiming it was only be temporary until she got her own mansion. Maya confided in Othello that she and Rick were back together and swore him to secrecy as Rick was pretending to reunite with Caroline despite her kiss with Ridge.

Alison Montgomery

Alison Montgomery was the assistant of Bill Spencer Jr. who does all his dirty work. She also had a brief romance with Deacon Sharpe.

Danielle Spencer

Danielle Spencer is portrayed by Guiding Light alumna Crystal Chappell. Danielle is the wife of Karen Spencer and the adoptive mother of Caroline Spencer. Danielle arrived from New York with Karen Spencer, who moved to Los Angeles to be closer to her daughter, Caroline Spencer. Caroline started seeing Thomas Forrester and brought him home to meet Karen, who introduced Thomas to Danielle. Thomas asked a lot of questions about Caroline's father, prompting Karen to tell Caroline, Danielle, and their old friend Jarrett Maxwell, a reporter at Spencer Publications, to keep quiet about their "family secret." But Karen finally revealed that Danielle was her partner and a second mother to Caroline. Karen arranged a job interview at Spencer for Danielle, who promised she wouldn't tell Karen's half-brother, Bill Spencer Jr., about their relationship. Bill was intrigued by Danielle's international exploits as a writer and mistakenly thought Danielle was hitting on him. With Danielle's coaxing, Karen finally came out to Bill, expecting the worst from her brother. However, Bill surprised Karen and accepted Danielle into the family.Karen reveals to she has been in a long-term relationship with Danielle after years of being forced by their father to hide her lifestyle. Karen also reveals her father threatened to disown and disinherit her, refused to meet Danielle or acknowledge that Karen had a partner, and attempted to marry her to a junior executive at Spencer Publications for show. Bill and Karen agreed to keep her secret from everyone. Later, Danielle and Karen were outraged when Caroline fell from a two-story balcony while arguing with Bill, and supported Katie when she staged an intervention to deal with Bill's drinking. Danielle commented that she had observed Bill relying too heavily on alcohol more than once. Danielle was stunned when Hope Logan, Bill's almost-daughter-in-law, crashed through the window with a golf club during the intervention and exposed Bill's illegal efforts to sabotage Hope's wedding to Bill's son, Liam Spencer. Danielle lent Caroline an ear when Caroline complained that her boyfriend, Rick Forrester, wasn't paying attention to her. Danielle was surprised to hear Caroline, who ran charitable organizations, demeaning the less fortunate, as Rick had taken an interest in down-on-her-luck singer Maya. Danielle was further dismayed when Caroline claimed that Karen and Danielle had spoiled her by raising her to have expensive tastes.

Father Fontana
 Father Fontana is portrayed by Luca Calvani in 2012 and 2013. Fontana was the priest who was supposed to marry Liam Spencer and Hope Logan in Italy. They never got married at all, and they never did get married in Italy. When Hope and Liam planned to get married a third time, Hope's mother Brooke Logan, had Fontana come to L.A. to have a reenactment of what would have happened in Italy. Taylor Hayes came with her daughter Steffy Forrester (who Liam also loves) and Steffy told him she's pregnant. Hope convinced Liam to stay with Steffy. Steffy lost the baby in a motorcycle accident. Hope and Liam planned to get married a 4th time, and concluded maybe Fontana's a jynx.

Dr Caspary
Dr Caspary is a gynecologist who has been involved in helping Brooke Logan and Steffy Forrester. She is portrayed by Jacqueline Hahn.

Dr Meade
Dr Meade is portrayed by Jon Hensley. He is a doctor at University hospital and has been involved in taking care of Katie Logan and Steffy Forrester. He is familiar with both the Logan and Forrester families.

Adele
Adele is portrayed by Taja V. Simpson. She was Katie Logan's assistant while she controlled Spencer Publications. Katie also frequently trusted Adele to look over her son, Will Spencer. Bill Spencer Jr., Katie's husband, took over the company and Adele was fired and replaced by Bill's trusted assistant, Alison Montgomery.

References

Bold and the Beautiful
Bold and the Beautiful